A World for Raúl is a short drama film. The film's run time is 15 minutes. It was written and directed by Mauro Mueller, and produced by Laura Pino and Ivan Madeo. It won a Student Academy Awards in 2013. The film was shot using a Sony F3 by cinematographer César Gutiérrez Miranda. The short film included on the DVD Boys on Film 14: Worlds Collide.
The short film included on the DVD Boys On Film 14: Worlds Collide.

Plot
In the film, the thirteen-year-old Raúl (Alexandré Barceló) in Mexico is asked to entertain the local landowner’s son, Hernán, played by Adrián Alonso. Soon, a game of power and pride starts between the two boys from different social classes. The film is a coming-of-age story.

Awards
Mauro, a 28-year-old Columbia University School of the Arts student at the time, won in narrative category of the Student Academy Awards. The film won also Best Dramatic Short at NY Shortsfest, 2013, Best Student Short Film at Aspen Shortsfest, 2013, CINE Special Jury Award (CINE Golden Eagle Film & Video Competition), 2013, Best film at hammer to nail short film contest, 2012, CINE Golden Eagle Award, 2012 and Best fiction film at Skena Up, 2012.
The film was also a winner of the Golden Horseman Best Short Fiction Film at Filmfest Dresden.

Other awards:
 Best Screenplay at Festival of Nations in Lenzing, Austria 2014
 The Golden Sun Jury award at Best of Short Film Festival at La Ciotat, 2013
 Jury Award for Best Narrative Short at Polari Film Festival Austin, 2013
 Best Fiction at Festival LA de Video y Artes Audiovisuales Rosario 2013
 Best Dramatic Short at Long Beach QFilm Festival, 2013
 Upcoming Talents Award at Solothurner Filmtage, 2013
 Accolade Competition, Awards of Excellence, 2012
 Student Select Best Writing Award at Columbia University Film Festival 2012
 IFP Audience Choice Award at Columbia University Film Festival 2012
 Faculty Selects + Student Selects at Columbia University Film Festival 2012
 Big Beach Award for Best Director at the Columbia University Film Festival 2012

Cast
Alexandré Barceló as Raúl
Adrián Alonso as Hernán
Gerardo Taracena as Juan, Raúl’s father
Roberto Luis Meza as Mr. Tamero, Hernán’s father
Adriana Paz as Raúl’s mother

Release
On 15 July 2012, the film had its world premiere at Outfest Film Festival in Los Angeles. The film had its European premiere at the 28th Warsaw International Film Festival in October 2012 in the Competition Short Films section and in Mexico at Morelia International Film Festival in November 2012. The film went on to screen at the Solothurn Film Festival, the Aspen Shortsfest and the Palm Springs International Festival of Short Films.

References

External links
 
 official website Fidelio Films: Un mundo para Raúl
 official film website

2012 films
2010s Spanish-language films
2012 drama films
2012 short films
Mexican drama films
Mexican short films
2010s Mexican films